Yengejeh Castle is a historical castle located in Ardabil County in Ardabil Province, The longevity of this fortress dates back to the Seljuk Empire.

References 

Castles in Iran
Seljuk castles